621 17th Street, formerly known as the First Interstate Tower South, is a high-rise building in Denver, Colorado, United States. The building stands as the 20th-tallest building in Denver and Colorado. It also stood as the tallest building in the city at the time of its 1957 completion, and held that distinction for eleven years until it was surpassed by the  Brooks Towers in 1968. 621 17th Street is considered to be one of the earliest modern skyscrapers in Denver.

At the time of its completion, 621 17th Street was known as "First National Bank Building", its primary tenant. After First Interstate merged with Wells Fargo in 1996, the building's official name became its address. The  First Interstate Tower North, now known as 633 17th Street, was built adjacent to First Interstate Tower South in 1974. The two buildings together form the First of Denver Plaza. The building with the First of Denver logo can be seen in the opening credits of the television show Dynasty.

See also
List of tallest buildings in Denver

References

Office buildings completed in 1957
Skyscraper office buildings in Denver
Skyscraper hotels in Denver